Graeme Vincent Fell (born 19 March 1959 in Dagenham, Essex, England) is a male former 3000 metres steeplechase runner.

Athletics career
Fell competed for England at the Commonwealth Games in Brisbane, Australia, winning a silver medal in the 3000 m steeplechase behind Julius Korir of Kenya.

In 1984 he took Canadian citizenship and competed for Canada at both the 1986 and 1994 Commonwealth Games (winning gold and bronze medals in the 3000m steeplechase). He also competed in two Olympics for Canada, in 1988 in  Seoul (where he finished 11th in the  steeplechase final) and in 1992 in Barcelona. In 1985 in Koblenz, he ran a personal best in the 3000 m steeplechase of 8:12.58, which stood as the Canadian national record for the event until 2013, when the record was broken by Matthew Hughes.

In 1985 he was a co-founder of the Vancouver Sun Run which he won twice in 1986 and 1987. In 2004 he was inducted into the British Columbia Sports Hall of Fame. He currently resides in Vancouver and coaches middle and long distance running. He also currently teaches grade six and seven students at Sir William Osler Elementary School. He teaches physical education, english, math, science and writing. In his debut marathon, Graeme Fell won the 1994 California International Marathon in a time of 2:16:13.

Achievements
All results regarding 3000 metres steeplechase unless stated

(q) indicates overall position achieved in qualifying rounds.

References

External links
 
 
 
 
 
 

1959 births
Living people
People from Dagenham
Sportspeople from Essex
Canadian male long-distance runners
English male long-distance runners
Canadian male steeplechase runners
English male steeplechase runners
Olympic male steeplechase runners
Olympic track and field athletes of Canada
Athletes (track and field) at the 1988 Summer Olympics
Athletes (track and field) at the 1992 Summer Olympics
Commonwealth Games gold medallists for Canada
Commonwealth Games silver medallists for England
Commonwealth Games bronze medallists for Canada
Commonwealth Games gold medallists in athletics
Athletes (track and field) at the 1982 Commonwealth Games
Athletes (track and field) at the 1986 Commonwealth Games
Athletes (track and field) at the 1990 Commonwealth Games
Athletes (track and field) at the 1994 Commonwealth Games
Competitors at the 1994 Goodwill Games
World Athletics Championships athletes for Great Britain
World Athletics Championships athletes for Canada
Japan Championships in Athletics winners
San Diego State Aztecs women's track and field athletes
University of British Columbia alumni
English emigrants to Canada
Commonwealth Games competitors for England
Medallists at the 1982 Commonwealth Games
Medallists at the 1986 Commonwealth Games
Medallists at the 1994 Commonwealth Games